A Husband on Vacation  also known as A Husband on Holiday (translit.Zawg fe Agaza or Zogue fi ijaza or Zogue fe Agaza) is a 1964 Egyptian romantic comedy film starring Salah Zulfikar and Laila Taher. The film is written by Rashad Hegazi and directed by Mohamed Abdel Gawad.

Plot 
Essam Nour El-Din is married to Gamalat and decides to escape from the boredom of his married life, so he claims to his wife that he is assigned to work for several months in the city of Aswan. Essam travels to Alexandria, to spend a vacation trip, when his wife discovers his trick, and decides to teach him a lesson, disguising herself as a playful blonde girl named Rosita.  Rosita or Gamalat tempts Essam, who falls in love with her, and events follow.

Crew 

 Screenplay: Rashad Hegazi
 Directed by: Mohamed Abdel Gawad
 Production Studio: General Company for Arab Film Production
 Distribution: General Company for Arab Film Production
 Cinematography: Adel Abdel Azim
 Music: Youssef Shawqi

Cast 

 Salah Zulfikar as Essam Nour El-Din
 Laila Taher as Gamalat
 Nadia Noqrashi as Fatima
 Abu Bakr Ezzat as Hussein
 Omar Afifi as Ahmed, Rawya's husband
 Hala El Shawarby as a Rawya
 Abdel-Khaleq Saleh as Bahgat Abdel Salam
 Fifi Saeed as Sania, Gamalat's mother
 Hussein Ismail as Sayed the janitor
 Edmond Toema as the waiter
 Gamil Ezz El-Din as Yousry

See also 

 Egyptian cinema
 Salah Zulfikar filmography
 List of Egyptian films of 1964
 List of Egyptian films of the 1960s

References

External links 

 
 Zogue fe Agaza on elCinema

1964 films
1960s Arabic-language films
1960s romance films
Egyptian black-and-white films
Egyptian romance films